Tomás Teresen (born August 14, 1987) is a male professional road cyclist from Venezuela.

Career

2005
1st in Stage 4 Vuelta a Sucre (VEN)
2006
1st in  National Championship, Road, U23, Venezuela, San Carlos, Cojedes (VEN)

References
 
 Venezuelan cyclists

1987 births
Living people
Venezuelan male cyclists
Place of birth missing (living people)
21st-century Venezuelan people